Cordobia is a genus of flowering plants belonging to the family Malpighiaceae.

Its native range is Paraguay to Northern Argentina.

Species:
 Cordobia argentea (Griseb.) Nied.

References

Malpighiaceae
Malpighiaceae genera